Mike Emmanuel Okoro   (born 30 December 1981 in Enugu, Nigeria) is a Nigerian retired professional footballer.

Sweden

Had a trial with BoIS alongside Zambian Chitalu Mpundu in 2005.

India

Receiving offers from Germany, Kolkata, Mumbai, and Goa in view of his performances with Indian Telephone Industries during 2001/02, Okoro ended up with East Bengal for the next season, striking a hat-trick in a 4-1 rout of Hindustan Aeronautics. Reuniting with East Bengal from Poland in 2005 despite interest from Dempo and Mahindra United months earlier. Skipping the Red & Gold Brigades encounter away to JCT to renew his Polish citizenship in February 2006, the club reportedly owed Okoro 130000 Rupees when he visited Poland for citizenship reasons. This amount was eventually given to him despite them originally saying that he in fact owed them 334000 Rupees.

Throughout his career, the Nigerian has been committed a series of transgressions, including pushing the referee in 2003 slapping a different referee while with Mohammedan in 2008 for "asking uncomfortable questions", and breaching contract regulations by exchanging teams mid-season despite signing a one-year contract with Mohammedan in 2007.

Personal life

His baby, Juliette, died in 2005, the same year she was born. With his Irish girlfriend Barbara, the striker took the educational responsibility of an orphan girl, who was then four years old.

HonoursEast Bengal'
ASEAN Club Championship: 2003

References

External links 
 Okoro wants to play for Mohun Bagan
 Okoro's goal takes East Bengal into final
 Polish Wikipedia Page
 mWyniki.pl Profile
 at Soccerway
 Liga Wielkopolska 2015 Profile

Expatriate footballers in India
Expatriate footballers in Poland
Nigerian expatriate footballers
Amica Wronki players
Mohammedan SC (Kolkata) players
Nigerian expatriate sportspeople in India
I-League players
Ekstraklasa players
Nigerian footballers
GKS Katowice players
East Bengal Club players
JCT FC players
Sokół Pniewy players
Nigerian expatriate sportspeople in Poland
1981 births
Living people
Association football forwards
Kogi United F.C. players
Footballers from Enugu